Genevois may refer to:

the people of Geneva
Genevois (province), a part of the former Duchy of Savoy
a dialect of the Franco-Provençal language